was a Japanese sailor. She won a silver medal in the 470 class at the 1996 Summer Olympics with Alicia Kinoshita.
Shige instructed other sailors in a yacht harbour local to her residence.

Shige died of breast cancer on 9 December 2018 at the age of 53.

References

External links
 
 
 

1965 births
2018 deaths
Japanese female sailors (sport)
Olympic sailors of Japan
Sailors at the 1992 Summer Olympics – 470
Sailors at the 1996 Summer Olympics – 470
Sailors at the 2000 Summer Olympics – 470
Olympic silver medalists for Japan
Olympic medalists in sailing
Medalists at the 1996 Summer Olympics
Deaths from breast cancer
Deaths from cancer in Japan